Here Comes Honey Boo Boo was an American reality television series that aired on TLC featuring the family of child beauty pageant contestant Alana "Honey Boo Boo" Thompson. The show premiered on August 8, 2012, and ended on August 14, 2014. Thompson and her family originally rose to fame on TLC's reality series Toddlers & Tiaras. The show's name comes from a taunt that Alana hurled at another pageant contestant during her debut in Toddlers and Tiaras, but a sweeping misinterpretation from the general public resulted in Alana being referred to as "Honey Boo Boo Child" instead. The show revolves around Alana "Honey Boo Boo" Thompson and her family's adventures in the town of McIntyre, Georgia. The reality series received predominantly negative reviews from television critics during its run.

On October 24, 2014, TLC cancelled the series after four seasons when cast member June "Mama June" Shannon was seen with Mark Anthony McDaniel, a man who served 10 years in prison after being convicted of aggravated child molestation in 2004 and who is a registered sex offender. This prompted Shannon to admit to Entertainment Tonight that the father of her daughter Lauryn "Pumpkin" Shannon was not McDaniel as previously stated, but Michael Anthony Ford, another convicted sex offender who served time for sexual exploitation of minors after being caught on To Catch a Predator in 2005. A number of episodes had already been taped for a fifth season, but none were released until TLC aired four of them as the two-hour special Here Comes Honey Boo Boo: The Lost Episodes on April 21, 2017.

Cast and premise
Besides Alana, who was six years old when the first season was filmed, the show features her stay-at-home mother June "Mama June" Shannon; her father Mike "Sugar Bear" Thompson, a chalk miner; and her three sisters: Lauryn "Pumpkin" Shannon, Jessica "Chubbs" Shannon, and Anna "Chickadee" Shannon (now Anna Cardwell). Anna Shannon gave birth to daughter Kaitlyn Cardwell in the first-season finale.

The first season of Here Comes Honey Boo Boo aired from August 8 to October 26, 2012, and was followed by four specials airing in early 2013.

In September 2012, Here Comes Honey Boo Boo was renewed for a second season. The second season debuted July 17, 2013, and concluded on September 11, 2013. The second season featured preparations for the wedding/"commitment ceremony" of June Shannon and Mike Thompson. For the second-season premiere, TLC distributed "Watch 'N' Sniff" cards, allowing viewers to release scents correlating with specific scenes.

On September 20, 2013, it was announced that TLC had ordered a twelve-episode third season and three specials. The third season premiered on January 16, 2014, and concluded on March 6, 2014.

Ratings and reception
The series premiere episode attained a 1.6 rating in the 18–49 demographic, attracting 2.2 million viewers. The series was one of TLC's highest-rated shows in its first season.  The August 29 episode, airing on Wednesday night during the 2012 Republican National Convention, attracted almost 3 million viewers and scored a 1.3 rating among 18- to 49-year-olds, the highest rating in that age group for any cable program that night. Fox News convention coverage was second in the time period with a 1.2 rating, while NBC coverage had a 1.1.

Critical reaction to the series has been mixed, with some characterizing the show as "offensive", "outrageous" and "exploitative", while others call it "must-see TV".

Criticism
The A.V. Club called the first episode a "horror story posing as a reality television program", with others worrying about potential child exploitation. James Poniewozik mostly praised the show, but criticized the producers for "the way that the show seems to assume that those viewers will look at this family and the world."

A reviewer for Forbes criticized TLC as trying to "portray Alana's family as a horde of lice-picking, lard-eating, nose-thumbing hooligans south of the Mason–Dixon line", stating that "it falls flat, because there's no true dysfunction here, save for the beauty pageant stuff". The Guardian also criticized the attempt to portray the Thompsons as people to "point and snicker at," saying, "none of the women or girls who participate in the show seems to hate themselves for their poverty, their weight, their less-than-urbane lifestyle, or the ways in which they diverge from the socially-acceptable beauty standard."

The Hollywood Reporter pronounced the show "horrifying," explaining:

TV Guide's "Cheers & Jeers 2012" issue commented, "Jeers to Here Comes Honey Boo Boo for existing. Alana Thompson and her family have lowered the TV bar to new depths while introducing viewers to the terms 'forklift foot' and 'neck crust.' In a word, ewww."

June Shannon herself was criticized for her daughter's diet, which included "Go Go Juice," a mixture of Red Bull and Mountain Dew that contains as much caffeine as two cups of coffee. She used the blended beverage to get her daughter ready for pageants. Shannon, in responding to such criticism, pointed out, "There are far worse things...I could be giving her alcohol."

Praise
Out praised the show for Alana Thompson's attitude toward her gay paternal uncle Lee "Poodle" Thompson; Thompson stated, "Ain't nothing wrong with bein' a little gay." Out noted the show's "clear message of equality" and said that Alana's acceptance of her gay relative "confounded" the stereotype of the "redneck" working-class, Southern white female.

June Shannon has been praised by Mother Nature Network for her "keen business sense" with which she feeds her family on $80 a week by clipping copious coupons, playing bingo, exploiting roadkill, and acquiring child-support checks from each of her four children's fathers.

Prior to the show's second season, Hank Stuever of The Washington Post said the show "feels as real to me as the Great Depression images shot by the WPA photographers" and praised the "solid—if unorthodox—family values."

Parodies
Here Comes Honey Boo Boo has been lampooned by the animated TV series South Park, in its season 16 episode "Raising the Bar", by the animated TV series MAD, in a short called "Here Comes Yogi Boo Boo", and in an online spoof uploaded on CollegeHumor called "Precious Plum."

Christopher Walken, Colin Farrell and Sam Rockwell took time from promoting their new film Seven Psychopaths to deliver a dramatic rendition of Here Comes Honey Boo Boo.

The film Scary Movie 5 featured a scene parodying Sinister where Simon Rex is frightened by an Alana look-a-like that pops out of a cardboard box and says, "A dollar makes me holla, honey boo boo child."

In the tenth season of competition reality show RuPaul's Drag Race, contestant Eureka O'Hara impersonated Alana during the show's recurring challenge 'Snatch Game', which is, in itself, a parody of the popular show Match Game.

Cancellation
On October 24, 2014, TLC announced the cancellation of the show after reports surfaced that June Shannon was dating a man convicted of child molestation. Shannon and her older daughter Lauryn denied these reports. The man in question, Mark Anthony McDaniel Sr., was convicted of aggravated child molestation of an 8-year-old in March 2004. McDaniel is listed as a registered sex offender with the Georgia Sex Offender Registry. Shannon's eldest daughter confirmed that she is the child who was molested by McDaniel 10 years earlier. TLC commented on the future of the series regarding the current situation with the following statement: "We are currently reassessing the reports, but we do not currently have Here Comes Honey Boo Boo in production".

An entire season's worth of episodes  which could reportedly fill six months of schedule  were left unaired, following the cancellation of the show.

Post-cancellation
Upon hearing of the show's cancellation, Vivid Entertainment president Steven Hirsch sent a letter to June Shannon, offering her and her former live-in partner, Mike Thompson, US$1 million to appear in a pornographic film. Hirsch stated that the studio's BBW themed productions have become a very popular genre on Vivid.com and VividTV, and he would make the couple's experience "enjoyable" for them both, as well as give them creative input. But June refused, explaining, "I have more respect for myself and my kids and my family. It ain't happening, not even for a zillion dollars."

Alana also collaborated with singer/songwriter Adam Barta in 2015, and along with sister Pumpkin, released a song called "Movin' Up," which was met with mixed reviews. The music video featured June and Sugar Bear, and amassed millions of views online, which started a viral craze, the "honey boo boo bop", written by Barta.

June "Mama June" Shannon and Mike "Sugar Bear" Thompson returned to reality television in 2015 as participants of Marriage Boot Camp: Reality Stars 4. While the couple were there to work on their marriage, Sugar Bear ultimately revealed his infidelities to June.

In 2017 June launched her own reality series on We TV called Mama June: From Not to Hot, produced and co-starring her manager, Gina Rodriguez, as well as Alana, Sugar Bear, and Lauryn.

In 2021, Alana and Mama June competed on the sixth season of The Masked Singer as the "Beach Ball".

Episodes

Season 1 (2012)

Season 2 (2013)

Season 3 (2014)

Season 4 (2014)

Specials

Spin-offs

On February 24, 2017, June "Mama June" Shannon returned to television for a nine-episode WE tv reality show, Mama June: From Not to Hot.

References

External links

 

2010s American reality television series
2012 American television series debuts
2014 American television series endings
English-language television shows
Television series by Authentic Entertainment
Television shows set in Georgia (U.S. state)
TLC (TV network) original programming
Reality television spin-offs
Television series about children
Television series about families
American television spin-offs